Martha Argerich (Eastern Catalan: [əɾʒəˈɾik]; born 5 June 1941) is an Argentine classical concert pianist. Born and raised in Buenos Aires to Jewish-Spanish parents, Argerich gave her debut concert at eight before receiving further piano training in Europe. At an early age, she won several competitions, including the VII International Chopin Piano Competition, and has since recorded numerous albums and performed with leading orchestras worldwide. The recipient of several awards, including three Grammy Awards, Argerich is widely considered one of the greatest pianists of all time.

Early life and education 

Argerich was born in Buenos Aires. Her paternal ancestors were Spaniards from Catalonia who had been based in Buenos Aires since the 18th century. Her maternal grandparents were Jewish immigrants from the Russian Empire, who settled in Colonia Villa Clara in Argentina's Entre Ríos Province, one of the colonies established by Baron de Hirsch and the Jewish Colonization Association. The provenance of the name Argerich is Catalonia.

A precocious child, Argerich began kindergarten at the age of two years and eight months, where she was the youngest child. A five-year-old boy, who was a friend, teased her that she would not be able to play the piano, and Argerich responded by playing perfectly, by ear, a piece their teacher played them. The teacher immediately called the mother and they "started making a fuss." Argerich started learning the piano at the age of three. At the age of five, she moved to teacher Vincenzo Scaramuzza, who stressed to her the importance of lyricism and feeling. Argerich gave her debut concert in 1949 at the age of eight. The family moved to Europe in 1955, where Argerich studied with Friedrich Gulda in Austria, whom Argerich describes as one of her major influences. She later studied with Stefan Askenase and Maria Curcio. Argerich also seized opportunities for brief periods of coaching with Madeleine Lipatti (widow of Dinu Lipatti), Abbey Simon, and Nikita Magaloff. In 1957, at sixteen, she won both the Geneva International Music Competition and the Ferruccio Busoni International Competition within three weeks of each other.

Following this success, Argerich had a personal and artistic crisis. After an abortive attempt to study with the Italian pianist Arturo Benedetti Michelangeli, who gave her only four lessons in the space of 18 months, she went to New York City, hoping but failing to meet and study with her idol, Vladimir Horowitz. She did not play the piano for three years and considered giving it up to train as a secretary or doctor. She credited Anny Askenase, the wife of Stefan Askenase, with encouraging her to return to the piano. Following her return, Argerich won the prestigious VII International Chopin Piano Competition in 1965.

Professional career 

Argerich performed her debut concert at the age of eight, playing Mozart's Piano Concerto No. 20 in D minor and Beethoven's Piano Concerto No. 1 in C major. Argerich gained international prominence when she won the VII International Chopin Piano Competition in Warsaw in 1965, at age 24. In that same year, she debuted in the United States in Lincoln Center's Great Performers Series. In 1960, she had made her first commercial recording, which included works by Chopin, Brahms, Ravel, Prokofiev, and Liszt; it received critical acclaim upon its release in 1961. She has since recorded works by composers including Ginastera, Rachmaninoff and Schumann, to whom she describes feeling a particular connection.

Argerich has often remarked in interviews of feeling "lonely" on stage during solo performances. Since the 1980s, she has staged few solo performances, concentrating instead on concertos and, in particular, chamber music, and collaborating with instrumentalists in sonatas.

Argerich has also promoted younger pianists, both through her annual festival and through her appearances as a member of the jury at international competitions. The pianist Ivo Pogorelić was thrust into the musical spotlight partly as a result of Argerich's actions: after he was eliminated in the third round of the 1980 International Chopin Piano Competition in Warsaw, Argerich proclaimed him a genius and left the jury in protest. According to Đặng Thái Sơn, the eventual winner, Argerich made the "beautiful gesture" of sending a public telegram to the judging committee to congratulate him, after learning the final results. She has supported several artists, including Gabriela Montero, Mauricio Vallina, Sergio Tiempo, Roberto Carnevale, Gabriele Baldocci, and Christopher Falzone.

Argerich is the president of the International Piano Academy Lake Como and performs annually at the Lugano Festival. She has also created and been a General Director of the Argerich Music Festival and Encounter in Beppu, Japan, since 1996.

Her aversion to the press and publicity has resulted in her remaining out of the limelight for most of her career. Nevertheless, she is widely recognized as one of the greatest pianists in history. Her performance of Liszt's First Piano Concerto conducted by Daniel Barenboim at The Proms 2016 prompted this review in The Guardian: "It was an unforgettable performance. Argerich celebrated her 75th birthday in June this year, but that news doesn't seem to have reached her fingers. Her playing is still as dazzling, as frighteningly precise, as it has always been; her ability to spin gossamer threads of melody as matchless as ever. This was unmistakably and unashamedly Liszt in the grand manner, a bit old-fashioned and sometimes even a bit vulgar at times, but in this of all concertos, with Barenboim and the orchestra following each twist and turn, every little quickening and moment of expressive reflection, it seemed entirely appropriate". Argerich returned to the Proms at the age of 78 in 2019 to perform Tchaikovsky's First Piano Concerto under the baton of Barenboim, a performance described as "mesmerizing".

Personal life 

Argerich has been married twice. Her first marriage was to the composer-conductor Robert Chen, whom she married after she became pregnant by him with her first daughter, violinist Lyda Chen-Argerich. Their marriage ended after several months, in 1964. From 1969 to 1973, Argerich was married to Swiss conductor Charles Dutoit, with whom she had a daughter, Annie Dutoit. Although they separated in 1973, Argerich continues to record and perform with Dutoit. In the 1970s, she had a relationship with the pianist Stephen Kovacevich, with whom she has a daughter, Stéphanie. Although they made few recordings together during their relationship, Argerich and Kovacevich still frequently perform together. Stéphanie Argerich explains in her film Bloody Daughter that as her parents were not married, they tossed a coin to name their daughter, for which Argerich won the toss. Argerich brought her children up in a manner described by Annie Dutoit as "bohemian"; Argerich preferred her children to stay at home rather than go to school, and would regularly host young musicians in her home and practice through the night.

Argerich is a polyglot and can speak Spanish, French, Italian, German, English, and Portuguese. Although her mother tongue is Spanish, she brought her children up speaking French. She has lived in Argentina, Belgium, Switzerland, and France, and holds citizenship in Switzerland and Argentina.

Argerich has never been connected to any political party. However, she stated in a 2019 interview that she is strongly against capital punishment, and admires the French politician Robert Badinter, who enacted the abolition of the death penalty in France. Her friend pianist Daniel Barenboim stated that when he contacted the Argentinian president Mauricio Macri in 2016, asking him to accept Syrian refugees into the country, it was also on behalf of Argerich.

In 1990, Argerich was diagnosed with malignant melanoma. After treatment, the cancer went into remission, but it recurred in 1995 and eventually metastasized to her lungs, pancreas, liver, brain, and lymph nodes. Following an experimental treatment at the John Wayne Cancer Institute in Santa Monica pioneered by oncologist Donald Morton, Argerich's cancer went into remission again. In gratitude, Argerich performed a recital at Carnegie Hall benefiting the institute. , Argerich remains cancer-free.

Media 

In 2002, director  released Martha Argerich: Conversation nocturne (Martha Argerich: Evening Talks), a documentary film about Argerich. Stéphanie Argerich Blagojevic, using film she had shot since childhood, directed a 2012 documentary film about her mother, titled Bloody Daughter.

Awards 
 Ferruccio Busoni International Piano Competition: 1st prize (1957)
 Geneva International Music Competition: 1st prize (1957)
 VII International Chopin Piano Competition: 1st prize (1965)
 Claudio Arrau Memorial Medal (1997)
 Diamond Konex Award (1999) as the most important classical musician of the decade in Argentina
Grammy Award for Best Instrumental Soloist(s) Performance (with orchestra):
Charles Dutoit (conductor), Martha Argerich, and the Montreal Symphony Orchestra for Prokofiev: Piano Concertos Nos. 1 and 3 / Bartók: Piano Concerto No. 3 (2000)
 Grammy Award for Best Chamber Music Performance:
Martha Argerich and Mikhail Pletnev for Prokofiev (Arr. Pletnev): Cinderella Suite for Two Pianos / Ravel: Ma mere l'Oye (2005)
 The Order of the Rising Sun, Gold Rays with Rosette (2005) Japan
 Praemium Imperiale (2005) Japan
 Grammy Award for Best Instrumental Soloist(s) Performance (with orchestra):
Claudio Abbado (conductor), Martha Argerich, and the Mahler Chamber Orchestra for Beethoven: Piano Concertos Nos. 2 and 3 (2006)
 Voted into Gramophones Hall of Fame (2012)
 Recipient of The Kennedy Center Honors (2016)
 Recipient of Order of Merit of the Italian Republic (2018)

See also 

Great Pianists of the 20th Century – Martha Argerich
Great Pianists of the 20th Century – Martha Argerich II
List of Argentines

Notes

References

External links 

"Argerich—Discography," (August 11, 1999)
Ross, Alex; 'Madame X', November 12, 2001, a profile of Argerich in The New Yorker
Martha Argerich, evening talks, the award-winning documentary film about Argerich by Georges Gachot – (imdb link)
Orga, Ates, River Plate Queen (1978, 2006), an interview with Argerich first published in the 1979 International Music Guide
MUSIC FESTIVAL Argerich's Meeting Point in Beppu, a music festival sponsored by the Argerich Arts Foundation of Beppu, Japan
The Martha Argerich Project
Argerich Music news, concert schedule, articles, recordings
Argerich's repertoire through the years
Martha Argerich biography, CD and concert review by cosmopolis.ch
Martha Argerich Project Brings Talent to Lugano  by Euro News, 15 June 2009

1941 births
Living people
20th-century Argentine musicians
20th-century classical pianists
21st-century Argentine musicians
21st-century classical pianists
Argentine classical pianists
Argentine people of Catalan descent
Argentine people of Russian-Jewish descent
Argentine women pianists
Deutsche Grammophon artists
EMI Classics and Virgin Classics artists
Grammy Award winners
Honorary Members of the Royal Academy of Music
Illustrious Citizens of Buenos Aires
International Chopin Piano Competition winners
Jewish Argentine musicians
Jewish classical pianists
Jewish women musicians
Kennedy Center honorees
Musicians from Buenos Aires
Prize-winners of the Ferruccio Busoni International Piano Competition
Pupils of Maria Curcio
Recipients of the Order of the Rising Sun, 4th class
Recipients of the Praemium Imperiale
Royal Philharmonic Society Gold Medallists
Women classical pianists
Winners of the Geneva International Music Competition
Decca Records artists
20th-century women pianists
21st-century women pianists